Ramelli is a surname. Notable people with the surname include:

Agostino Ramelli (1531–1600), Italian engineer
Abbot Giovanni Felice Ramelli (1666–1740), Italian painter
Ilaria Ramelli (born 1973), Italian historian and author
Sergio Ramelli, (1956-1975), Italian student, victim of a political crime

See also
Ranelli